is a railway station on the Iida Line in the town of Tatsuno, Kamiina District, Nagano, Japan, operated by Central Japan Railway Company (JR Central).

Lines
Ina-Shimmachi Station is served by the Iida Line and is 193.4 kilometers from the starting point of the line at Toyohashi Station.

Station layout
The station consists of one ground-level island platform connected to the station building by a level crossing. The station is unattended.

Platforms

Adjacent stations

History
It was renamed Ina-Shimmachi on 1 August 1943. With the privatization of Japanese National Railways (JNR) on 1 April 1987, the station came under the control of JR Central.

Passenger statistics
In fiscal 2016, the station was used by an average of 79 passengers daily (boarding passengers only).

Surrounding area

Tenryū River

See also
 List of railway stations in Japan

References

External links

 Ina-Shimmachi Station information 

Railway stations in Nagano Prefecture
Railway stations in Japan opened in 1909
Stations of Central Japan Railway Company
Iida Line
Tatsuno, Nagano